Ganga Narayan Singh (25 April 1790 – 7 February 1833) was an Indian revolutionary from Jungle Mahals, known as the leader of Bhumij rebellion. He led a revolt against the East India Company in 1832-33. The British called it "Ganga Narain's Hungama", while some historians have called it the Chuar rebellion.

Biography

Early life and background 
Ganga Narayan was born on 25 April 1790 at Bandhdhih village of Jungle Mahal, British India. His father was Laxman Narayan Singh and mother was Mamta Devi. He was the grandson of Vivek Narayan Singh, the King of Barabhum. He had two brothers Shyamkishore Singh and Shyam Lal Singh. His mother, Mamta Devi was humble and pious in nature, but was a staunch opponent of British tyranny. She always encouraged her two sons Ganga Narayan and Shyam Lal to fight against the British.

Barabhum Raj 
Vivek Narayan Singh, the king of Barabhum, had two queens. Two queens had two sons. After the death of King Vivek Narayan Singh in the 18th century, there was a struggle for successor between two sons Lakshman Narayan Singh and Raghunath Narayan Singh.

According to the traditional Bhumij system, Lakshman Narayan Singh, the son of the elder queen, was the only one who had the succession. But a long family dispute started after the British nominated the younger son of the king Raghunath Narayan Singh as the king. The local Bhumij sardars used to support Lakshman Singh. But he could not stand the British support and military aid received by Raghunath. Laxman Singh was expelled from the state. Laxman Singh was given the jagir of Bandhdih village for his livelihood, where his only job was to look after the Bandhadih Ghat.

The expelled Lakshman Singh had settled in the village of Bandhdih and tried to get the kingdom and struggled to become the king. But later he was arrested by the British and sent to Medinipur Jail, where he died.

Rebellion 
In 1765, the East India Company, after acquiring the Diwani of Bengal, Bihar, Orissa from the Mughal Emperor Badshah Shah Alam of Delhi, started atrocities on poor farmers in Jungle Mahals and started taking new measures to collect revenue. For this, the British government made salt tax, Daroga system, land sale law, arrival of moneylenders, rules related to forest law, land auction and Dahmi system, and revenue collection succession rules to collect more revenue from the land of Bhumijs in Manbhum, Barahbhum, Singhbhum, Dhalbhum, Patkum, Medinipur, Bankura and Vardhman etc. Thus, by all means, the British exploitation of the tribals and the poor peasants went on increasing.

Ganga Narayan Singh was determined to take revenge on the British against the law relating to exploitation, oppression on poor farmers in Jungle Mahal. The peoples of Jungle Mahal became aware and united under the leadership of Ganga Narayan and raised a rebellion against the British. He explained to all the castes of Jungle Mahal about the exploitative policies of the British and organized them to fight. This led to discontent which took form of a strong struggle under the leadership of Ganga Narayan Singh in 1832 AD. This struggle has been called by the British as Ganga Narain's Hungama and historians have written it under the name Chuar rebellion.

Ganga Narayan was the first hero to fight against the British, who first formed the Sardar Guerrilla Vahini army. On which there was support of every castes. Jirpa Laya (Jilpa Laya) was appointed as the chief commander of the army. The Raja-Maharajas, zamindars and ghatwals of Dhalbhum, Patkum, Shikharbhum, Singhbhum, Panchet, Jhalda, Kashipur, Vamani, Baghmundi, Manbhum, Ambika Nagar, Amiyapur, Shyamsundarpur, Phulkusma, Ranipur  supported Ganga Narayan Singh. Ganga Narayan attacked and killed the Diwan of Barahbhum and British broker Madhab Singh in Vandih on 2 April 1832. After that, along with Sardar Vahini, the court of Barahbazar Muffasil, the office of the salt inspector and the police station were set on fire.

The Collector of Bankura, Russell, arrived to arrest Ganga Narayan, but the Sardar Vahini army surrounded him from all sides. All the British army were killed, but Russell somehow escaped to Bankura. This movement of Ganga Narayan took the form of a storm, which trampled the British regiments in Chhatna, Jhalda, Akro, Ambika Nagar, Shyamsundarpur, Raipur, Phulkusma, Shilda, Kuilapal and various places in Bengal. the impact of his movement was vigorous in places like Purulia, Vardhman and Medinipur districts of Bankura in Bengal, entire Chotanagpur of Bihar (now Jharkhand), Mayurbhanj, Keonjhar and Sundergarh in Orissa etc. as a result, the entire jungle mahal was out of the control of the british. everyone started supporting ganga narayan singh as a true honest, brave, patriot and social worker.

Eventually the British had to send an army from Barrackpore Cantonment, which was sent under the leadership of Lieutenant Colonel Kapoor. The army was also defeated in the conflict. After this Ganga Narayan and his followers expanded the scope of their action plan. The commissioner Baton of Bardhaman and the commissioner Hunt of Chotanagpur were also sent but they too could not succeed and had to face defeat. Thus, the struggle was so effective that the British were forced to withdraw the land sale law, succession law, excise duty on lac, salt law, jungle law.

Thakur Chetan Singh of Kharsawan was running his rule in collusion with the British. Ganga Narayan went to Porahat and Singhbhum Chaibasa and organized the Kol (Ho) tribes there to fight against Thakur Chetan Singh and the British. On February 6, 1833, Ganga Narayan along with the Kol (Ho) tribesmen attacked Thakur Chetan Singh's Hindshahar police station, but unfortunately died fighting against the British on 7 February 1833.

See also 
 Bhumij rebellion
 Chuar rebellion
 Jirpa Laya

References 

1790 births
1833 deaths
Indian revolutionaries
Bhumij people